UN Security Council Resolution 1803 was adopted  on March 3, 2008, by a vote of 14-0-1, with Indonesia as the only abstention. The Security Council of the United Nations, acting pursuant to Article 41 of Chapter VII of the UN Charter, required Iran to cease and desist from any and all uranium enrichment. It also required Iran to stop any research and development associated with centrifuges and uranium enrichment.

Termination
The provisions of Resolution 1803 were terminated by United Nations Security Council Resolution 2231 effective on Implementation Day of the Joint Comprehensive Plan of Action, 16 January 2016.

See also
 Sanctions Against Iran
 Current international tensions with Iran

References
SECURITY COUNCIL TIGHTENS RESTRICTIONS ON IRAN’S PROLIFERATION-SENSITIVE NUCLEAR website Department of Public Information UN Security Council
UN Security Council Resolution 1803 on Iran's Nuclear Program - US Dept. of State

External links
Text of the Resolution at undocs.org

 1803
United Nations Security Council sanctions regimes
Nuclear program of Iran
2008 in Iran
 1803
 1803
Sanctions against Iran
March 2008 events